John Curran (1 March 1864 – January 1933) was a Scottish footballer who played as a full back. He played in the 1894 Scottish Cup Final with Celtic (a defeat by Rangers) and won the Scottish Football League title in the same season (having played a smaller role in their 1892–93 championship win). After Curran moved to England with Liverpool, the team gained promotion as winners of the Second Division in 1894–95, and he was still with the Reds at the start of the following campaign (which ended in relegation) but soon moved on to Hibernian then again to Motherwell.

References

External links
 Fitbastats Hibs profile
 LFC History profile

1864 births
1933 deaths
Footballers from Bellshill
Liverpool F.C. players
Benburb F.C. players
Celtic F.C. players
Hibernian F.C. players
Motherwell F.C. players
Association football fullbacks
English Football League players
Scottish footballers
Scottish Football League players